"Born to Run" is a song by American singer-songwriter Bruce Springsteen, and the title song of his album Born to Run. Upon its release, music critic Robert Christgau took note of its wall of sound influence and called it "the fulfillment of everything 'Be My Baby' was about and lots more".

"Born to Run" was Springsteen's first worldwide single release, although it achieved little initial success outside of the United States. Within the U.S. it received extensive airplay on progressive or album-oriented rock radio stations. The single was also Springsteen’s first top 40 hit on the Billboard Hot 100, peaking at #23.

The song ranked number 21 on the Rolling Stone list of the 500 Greatest Songs of All Time, the highest entry for a song by Springsteen, and is included in The Rock and Roll Hall of Fame's 500 Songs that Shaped Rock and Roll.

Composition
In late 1973, on the road in Tennessee, Springsteen awoke with the title "Born to Run", which he wrote down. According to Springsteen, this was the first spark of the later song.

Written in the first person, the song is a love letter to a girl named Wendy, for whom the hot rod-riding protagonist seems to possess the passion to love, just not the patience. However, Springsteen has noted that it has a much simpler core: getting out of Freehold. U.S. Route 9, a highway passing through Freehold, is mentioned from the lyric "sprung from cages out on Highway 9".

In his 1996 book Songs, Springsteen relates that while the beginning of the song was written on guitar around the opening riff, the song's writing was finished on piano, the instrument that most of the Born to Run album was composed on. The song was recorded in the key of E major.

In the period prior to the release of Born to Run Springsteen was becoming well-known (especially in his native northeast) for his live shows. "Born to Run" joined his concert repertoire well before the release of the album, being performed in concert by May 1974, if not earlier.

The first recording of the song was made by Allan Clarke of the British group the Hollies, although its release was delayed, only appearing after Springsteen's own now-famous version.

Recording 
In recording the song Springsteen first earned his noted reputation for perfectionism, laying down as many as eleven guitar tracks to get the sound just right. The recording process and alternate ideas for the song's arrangement are described in the Wings For Wheels documentary DVD included in the 2005 reissue Born to Run 30th Anniversary Edition package.

On January 8, 1974, Springsteen met his manager, Mike Appel, Clarence Clemons, and the other members of his band at 914 Sound Studios, Blauvelt, New York, to rehearse two new compositions, "Jungleland" and "Born to Run", both of which were lacking lyrics. He continued working on both songs at his home in New Jersey. The original backing track was recorded on May 21, 1974, after rehearsal sessions. Vocals were recorded on June 26, 1974. Recording was not completed until August 6, 1974, when mixing began on seventy-two tracks to the sixteen available at 914 Studios, including strings, more than one dozen guitar tracks, sax, drums, glockenspiel, bass, multiple keyboards and a variety of voices. The core instrumental backing track, which had been re-recorded, was mixed, along with numerous test arrangements, backing vocals, double-tracked vocals and strings, and finally the one chosen for release. Springsteen and Mike Appel were the producers, and Louis Lahav was chief engineer. After finally going in the can, the tapes sat for a year, waiting for the rest of the album to be completed.

A pre-release version of the song, with a slightly different mix, was given by Appel to disc jockey Ed Sciaky of WMMR in Philadelphia, and played with Springsteen as his special guest on November 3, 1974, and within a couple of weeks this version was given to other progressive rock radio outlets in the Northeast as well, including WNEW-FM in New York City, WMMS in Cleveland, WBCN in Boston, and WVBR in Ithaca, New York.  It became quite popular on these stations, and led to older cuts from Springsteen's first two albums being played, as anticipation built for the new album. When Springsteen did a show at the Main Point, Bryn Mawr, Pennsylvania, on February 5, 1975, with Sciaky as host, the crowd sang along to "Born to Run".

Music videos 
No music video was made for the original release of "Born to Run".

In 1987, a video was released to MTV and other channels, featuring a live performance of "Born to Run" from Springsteen and the E Street Band's 1984–1985 Born in the U.S.A. Tour, interspersed with clips of other songs' performances from the same tour.  It closed with a "Thank you" message to Springsteen's fans.
In 1988, director Meiert Avis shot a video of an acoustic version of the song during the Tunnel of Love Express tour.
Both videos are included in the compilations Video Anthology / 1978-88 and The Complete Video Anthology / 1978-2000.

Reception
At the time of the single release, Billboard described "Born to Run" as "one of the best rock anthems to individual freedom ever created," describing it as "a monster song with a piledriver arrangement" that could become Springsteen's biggest hit yet.  Cash Box said that "Springsteen sounds like a cross between Roger McGuinn (from his Byrds days) and nobody else we've ever heard."

In 1980 the New Jersey State Assembly passed a resolution naming "Born to Run" the "unofficial rock theme of our State's youth."

Accolades
In 2016, "Born to Run" was ranked No. 16 in Pitchforks list of "The 200 Best Songs of the 1970s"
In 2004, the song was ranked #6 in WXPN's list of The 885 All-Time Greatest Songs.
Rolling Stone magazine's list of the 500 Greatest Songs of All Time placed it at No. 21.
The song came in at No. 920 in Q'''s list of the "1001 Greatest Songs Ever" in 2003, in which they described the song as "best for working class heroes."
It is one of The Rock and Roll Hall of Fame's 500 Songs that Shaped Rock and Roll.
In 2001, the RIAA's Songs of the Century placed the song 135th (out of 365).
In 1999, National Public Radio included the song in the "NPR 100", NPR's music editors' compilation of the one hundred most important American musical works of the 20th century.

 Live performances 

The song has been played at nearly every non-solo Springsteen concert since 1975 (although it was not included in the 2006 Sessions Band Tour).  Most of the time the house lights are turned fully on and fans consistently sing along with Springsteen's signature wordless vocalizations throughout the song's performance.

The song has also been released in live versions on seven albums or DVDs:
A 1975 Born to Run Tour rendition on Hammersmith Odeon London '75, released in 2006;
A 1985 Born in the U.S.A. Tour runthrough on Live/1975-85, released in 1986;
A starkly different 1988 solo acoustic guitar performance from the Tunnel of Love Express on Chimes of Freedom, a 1988 EP;
A 2000 Reunion Tour version on Bruce Springsteen & the E Street Band: Live In New York City, released in 2001 (the song closes disc one but does not appear on the track listing of the album cover);
A 2002 Rising Tour take on the Live in Barcelona DVD, released in 2003.
A 2009 Working on a Dream Tour performance on the DVD London Calling: Live in Hyde Park which was released in 2010.
A 2018 Springsteen on Broadway performance, released on a Netflix special and an album of the same name at the end of the year.

"Born to Run" was also performed as the second number of four during Springsteen and the E Street Band's halftime performance at Super Bowl XLIII.

On Jon Stewart's last episode as host of The Daily Show on August 6, 2015, Springsteen performed "Land of Hope and Dreams" and "Born to Run".

Covers

Frankie Goes to Hollywood covered this song in their debut album Welcome to the Pleasuredome in 1984.
Big Daddy, a band that specializes in recording popular modern songs in 1950s-style arrangements, performed a drastically re-arranged cover of "Born to Run" on their 1985 album "Meanwhile, Back in the States."
Cowboy Mouth covered "Born to Run" on the 2003 album Light Of Day (A Tribute To Bruce Springsteen).  

Live covers
Melissa Etheridge sang "Born to Run" at the September 11 benefit, The Concert for New York City, and again at the 2009 Kennedy Center Honors, where she performed the song for Springsteen himself, one of the Center's honorees for that year.
British band, McFly, performed the song for BBC Radio 1's Live Lounge on December 10, 2007.
The Australian band, Something for Kate, frequently covers "Born to Run" at live performances.
A rare live recording of Roger Daltrey singing "Born to Run" at a live solo performance appears on his greatest hits/rarities collection Gold.
On August 25, 2015, the 40th anniversary of Born to Runs release, indie rock band Superchunk shared a live cover of the title track. This performance also featured ...And You Will Know Us By the Trail of Dead and Crooked Fingers.

Track listing
"Born to Run" – 4:31
"Meeting Across the River" – 3:18

The B-side was simply another cut from the album; Springsteen would not begin releasing unused tracks as B-sides until 1980.

Personnel
According to authors Philippe Margotin and Jean-Michel Guesdon:

Bruce Springsteen – vocals, acoustic and electric guitars
David Sancious – piano, Fender Rhodes, synthesizer
Garry Tallent – bass
Ernest "Boom" Carter – drums
Danny Federici – organ, glockenspiel
Clarence Clemons – saxophone
Unknown musicians – string section, tambourines, backing vocals

 In popular culture 

On the children's show, Sesame Street in 1980, this song was parodied as "Born to Add".
The 2009 book about running Born to Run by Christopher McDougall was named after the song, and the lyrics are also quoted at the start of one chapter.
In John Niven's novel The Second Coming, the main character (Jesus) performs Born to Run live during an American Idol-like casting show.
The song is played at the start of the post-parade before the annual Haskell Invitational at Monmouth Park Racetrack in Oceanport, New Jersey.
The song was punned in the February 7, 2016 Pearls Before Swine with Pig wanting a burger from Wendy's.
The song was performed by Congressman Joe Crowley by way of conceding defeat to Alexandria Ocasio-Cortez in their district's Democratic primary for the 2018 midterm election in the United States.
The song was featured prominently in the 2019 movie Blinded by the Light.
In the thriller novel, “Battle Royale” the song and its lyrics are referenced.

 Charts 

Weekly charts

Year-end charts

Certifications

References

External links
 [ Born to Run' review"], AllMusic.
 Lyrics & Audio clips from Brucespringsteen.net
 "The Birth of Born to Run", Slate''.

1975 singles
1975 songs
Bruce Springsteen songs
Columbia Records singles
Song recordings produced by Bruce Springsteen
Song recordings produced by Mike Appel
Song recordings with Wall of Sound arrangements
Songs about New Jersey
Songs written by Bruce Springsteen
U.S. Route 9